Jeny de los Reyes Aguilar (16 December 1977 – 14 August 2010) was a Mexican politician from the Institutional Revolutionary Party. She served as Deputy of the LXI Legislature of the Mexican Congress representing Michoacán.

On 14 August 2010 Reyes, her husband and their eight-year-old daughter died on a road accident in Guerrero.

References

1977 births
2010 deaths
People from Morelia
Politicians from Michoacán
Women members of the Chamber of Deputies (Mexico)
Institutional Revolutionary Party politicians
Road incident deaths in Mexico
21st-century Mexican politicians
21st-century Mexican women politicians
Deputies of the LXI Legislature of Mexico
Members of the Chamber of Deputies (Mexico) for Michoacán